Nicholson River may refer to:

Nicholson River (Queensland)
Nicholson River (Victoria)
Nicholson River (Western Australia)

See also 
 Nicholson (disambiguation)